Easterday may refer to:

Easterday, Kentucky, an unincorporated community in Carroll County
C. M. Easterday (1855–1918), American politician in the Washington State Senate
Henry Easterday (1864–1895), professional baseball player
Katy Easterday (Roy Alexander Easterday, 1894–1976), American football and basketball player, athlete, coach, college athletics administrator, and dentist
Kenny Easterday (1973–2016), American man born with the rare disability, sacral agenesis

See also
Easter